Sardar Muhammad Abdul Qayyum Khan (also known as ʻAbdul Qayyūm K̲h̲ān, Urdu: سردار محمد عبدالقيوم خان) was a Kashmiri politician who also served as the president  and the prime minister of Azad Jammu and Kashmir (AJK). He also remained President of All Jammu and Kashmir Muslim Conference for over 20 years. He belonged to Dhund-Abbassi Tribe.

Early life and career 
Sardar Abdul Qayyum was born on 4 April 1924 in Ghaziabad, Bagh tehsil (Poonch jagir), then part of the princely state of Jammu and Kashmir. After completing his secondary education in Jammu, he joined the Engineers Corps of the British Indian Army and served in Africa and the Middle East.

1947 Kashmir conflict 
He actively participated in the Kashmiri freedom struggle. His title Mujahid-e-Awwal (the first holy warrior) is based on the belief that he is the person who fired the first shot in the Indo-Pakistani War of 1947.

Political career 
In 1951, he joined the All Jammu and Kashmir Muslim Conference. He was elected president of this body a record 14 times during his lifetime.
He was elected as President of Azad Jammu and Kashmir (AJK) state three times in 1956, 1971 and 1985. "Towards the end of his term, his relations with then prime minister Zulfiqar Ali Bhutto started turning sour. As a result in 1974, Sardar Abdul Qayyum Khan was removed from the office of the president through a vote of no confidence."

He also remained Prime Minister of Azad Kashmir from 1991 to 1996. In 2002, he was made chairman of the National Kashmir Committee. His son Sardar Attique Ahmed Khan also became Prime Minister of Azad Kashmir in 2006 and then again in 2010.

Writer 
He is the author of dozens of books on the Kashmir Freedom Struggle (Kashmir conflict). He also wrote on political, mystic, spiritual and religious topics. Some of the publications include:

Kashmir seeks attention
Kashmir problem : options for settlement? : a geopolitical analysis
Kashmīr bane gā Pākistān.
Āzād Kashmīr men̲ Islāmī qavānīn kā nafāz̲, on the enforcement of Islamic laws in Azad Kashmir during 1971–1975; speeches and articles previously published separately in various journals.
Muqaddamah-yi Kashmīr, a historical study on the Kashmir dispute.

Death and legacy 
He died in Rawalpindi on 10 July 2015. The Azad Kashmir government announced a three-day mourning period on his death.

See also 
 Presidents of Kashmir
 Chaudhry Ghulam Abbas

References 

1924 births
2015 deaths
Pahari Pothwari people
People from Azad Kashmir
Presidents of Azad Kashmir
Pakistan Movement activists from Kashmir
People of the 1947 Kashmir conflict